The Hampshire Cup is an annual rugby union knock-out club competition organised by the Hampshire Rugby Football Union.  It was first introduced during the 1970–71 season, with the inaugural winners being U.S. Portsmouth.  It is the most important rugby union cup competition in Hampshire, ahead of the Hampshire Bowl and Hampshire Plate.

The Hampshire Cup is currently open to club sides based in Hampshire, the Isle of Wight or the Channel Islands, who play between tier 6 (London 1 South) and tier 7 (London 2 South West) of the English rugby union league system.  The format is a knockout cup with a preliminary round, semi-finals and a final to be held at the home ground of one of the finalists between March–May.

Hampshire Cup winners

Number of wins
Havant (19)
Basingstoke (14)
U.S. Portsmouth (6)
Winchester (3)
Aldershot Services (1)
Andover (1)
Bournemouth (1)
Gosport & Fareham (1)
Portsmouth (1)

Notes

See also
 Hampshire RFU
 Hampshire Bowl
 Hampshire Plate
 English rugby union system
 Rugby union in England

References

External links
 Hampshire RFU

Recurring sporting events established in 1970
1970 establishments in England
Rugby union cup competitions in England
Rugby union in Hampshire